The Dumpling Island Archeological Site is a Late Woodland period archaeological site on Dumpling Island in Suffolk, Virginia, United States.  The site encompasses the remains of a Native American village associated with the Nansemond people.  The island was identified by explorer John Smith as a "Chaukie Hand" because of the large shell middens he saw.  The Nansemond village was attacked and burned by English colonists from the Jamestown Colony in 1609, but quickly recovered.  Test excavations in 1986 and 1995 found the site to be in excellent condition.

The site was listed on the National Register of Historic Places in 1998.

See also
National Register of Historic Places listings in Suffolk, Virginia

References

Archaeological sites on the National Register of Historic Places in Virginia
National Register of Historic Places in Suffolk, Virginia
Buildings and structures completed in 1609